HMS C27 was one of 38 C-class submarines built for the Royal Navy in the first decade of the 20th century.

Design and description
The C-class boats of the 1907–08 and subsequent Naval Programmes were modified to improve their speed, both above and below the surface. They displaced  on the surface and  submerged. The C-class submarines had a crew of two officers and fourteen ratings.

For surface running, the boats were powered by a single 12-cylinder  Vickers petrol engine that drove one propeller shaft. When submerged the propeller was driven by a  electric motor. They could reach  on the surface and  underwater.

The boats were armed with two 18-inch (45 cm) torpedo tubes in the bow. They could carry a pair of reload torpedoes, but generally did not as they would have to remove an equal weight of fuel in compensation.

Construction and career
HMS C27 was built by Vickers, Barrow. She was laid down on 4 June 1908 and was commissioned on 14 August 1909. HMS C27 along with the trawler Princess Louise (ex-Princess Marie Jose) sank  in the Fair Isle Channel between Orkney and Shetland on 20 July 1915 using the U-boat trap tactic. The tactic was to use a decoy trawler to tow a submarine. When a U-boat was sighted, the tow line and communication line was slipped and the submarine would attack the U-boat. The tactic was partly successful, but was abandoned after the loss of two C class submarines. In both cases, all the crew were lost.

HMS C27 was involved in the Baltic operations from 1915 to 1918. HMS C27 was salvaged for breaking up in Finland in August 1953.

Notes

References

External links
 MaritimeQuest HMS C27 pages

 

British C-class submarines
Royal Navy ship names
Ships built in Barrow-in-Furness
World War I shipwrecks in the Baltic Sea
Maritime incidents in 1918
1909 ships
Shipwrecks of Finland
Scuttled vessels of the United Kingdom